This article describes Coventry City Football Club's progress in the 2004–05 season, during which the Sky Blues competed in the Football League Championship, the FA Cup (entering in the Third Round) and the League Cup (entering from the First Round). The 2004–05 season was the last season in which the club played their home games at Highfield Road before their move to the Ricoh Arena.

Matches

Championship

League Cup

FA Cup

Championship data

League table

Results summary

Round by round

Scores Overview

Season statistics

Stats and goals

|-
|colspan="14"|Players who featured for Coventry but left before the end of the season:

|}

Goalscorers

Overall

References

Coventry City
Coventry City F.C. seasons